Crosby v. National Foreign Trade Council, 530 U.S. 363 (2000), was a unanimous case in which the Supreme Court of the United States used the federal preemption doctrine to strike down the Massachusetts Burma Law, a law that effectively prohibited Massachusetts' governmental agencies from buying goods and services from companies conducting business with Myanmar (Burma), essentially a secondary boycott. The Massachusetts Burma Law was modeled after similar legislation that had targeted the apartheid regime of South Africa.

The Court reasoned that since the United States Congress passed a law imposing sanctions on Myanmar, the Massachusetts law "undermines the intended purpose and 'natural effect' of at least three provisions of the federal Act, that is, its delegation of effective discretion to the President to control economic sanctions against Burma, its limitation of sanctions solely to United States persons and new investment, and its directive to the President to proceed diplomatically in developing a comprehensive, multilateral strategy towards Burma."

See also
 Doe v. Unocal
 List of United States Supreme Court cases, volume 530

References

Further reading

External links

United States Supreme Court cases
United States Supreme Court cases of the Rehnquist Court
United States federal preemption law
2000 in United States case law
Legal history of Massachusetts
Myanmar–United States relations